Stephen Holmes (also known as Steven Hall) is a CIA officer who, as of 2013, was the Station chief at the Embassy of the United States in Moscow, the top U.S. intelligence representative with Russia. Holmes's identity was revealed on May 17, 2013, by the Russian FSB in retaliation for Ryan Fogle's alleged attempts to recruit agents for the US.

See also
 List of CIA station chiefs

References

Year of birth missing (living people)
Living people
2013 in Russia
People of the Central Intelligence Agency
Russia–United States relations